Donny Ristanto (born July 12, 1977) is a professional Indonesian basketball player who plays for Pacific Caesar Surabaya. He is now one of the oldest active player in IBL Indonesia now.

He played as center in his basketball club now.

Professional career 
Donny first team is CLS Knights Surabaya, then he moved to Indonesia Warriors (ABL), he also have played for Satria Muda Jakarta in the pre season tournament, and now he play for Pacific Caesar Surabaya.

Regular Seasons

References

1977 births
Living people
Indonesian men's basketball players
ASEAN Basketball League players
Centers (basketball)